Noorvik (meaning "A place to move to") is an Iñupiat city in the Northwest Arctic Borough in the U.S. state of Alaska. As of the 2020 census, the population of the city was 694, up from 668 in 2010. Located in the NANA Region Corp, Noorvik has close ties with the largest city in the region, Kotzebue. Residents speak a dialect of Iñupiaq known as Noorvik Inupiaq. Noorvik was the first town to be counted in the 2010 census.

Geography

Noorvik is located at  (66.837130, -161.036641).

Demographics

Noorvik first appeared on the 1920 U.S. Census as an unincorporated village. It formally incorporated in 1964.

As of the census of 2000, there were 634 people in 136 households, including 113 families, in the city. The racial makeup of the city was 4.89% White, 90.06% Native American, 4.89% from two or more races, and 0.16% Pacific Islander.

Of the 136 households 58.1% had children under the age of 18 living with them, 51.5% were married couples living together, 18.4% had a female householder with no husband present, and 16.9% were non-families. 14.7% of households were one person and 1.5% were one person aged 65 or older.  The average household size was 4.66 and the average family size was 5.19.

In the city, the age distribution of the population shows 44.5% under the age of 18, 10.6% from 18 to 24, 26.2% from 25 to 44, 11.5% from 45 to 64, and 7.3% 65 or older.  The median age was 21 years. For every 100 females, there were 135.7 males.  For every 100 females age 18 and over, there were 134.7 males.

The median household income was $51,964 and the median family income  was $52,708. Males had a median income of $34,750 versus $24,583 for females. The per capita income for the city was $12,020.  About 9.4% of families and 7.6% of the population were below the poverty line, including 8.6% of those under age 18 and 3.8% of those age 65 or over.

History
Noorvik means "a place that is moved to" in Inupiaq. The village was established by Kowagmuit Inupiat fishermen and hunters from Deering in the early 1900s. Other settlers came from Oksik, a few miles upriver. The area had previously been inhabited by Kuuŋmuit Inuit up until the beginning of the 20th century, whose organized settlements had largely disappeared by the turn of the century due to famine and a flu outbreak. However, the village tribal association has founded itself on "the legacy of the Kuuŋmuit Inuit," including basing their logo on a map of the Kuuŋmuit's former territory.

Education
The Aqqaluk Noorvik School, operated by the Northwest Arctic Borough School District, serves the community.  it had 12 teachers and 186 students, with Alaska Natives and Native Americans, making up 94% and 1% of the student body respectively

Transport
The city includes the Robert (Bob) Curtis Memorial Airport, also known as the Noorvik Airport, 1 mile southeast from the city.

References

External links
Subsistence wildlife harvests in five northwest Alaska communities, 2001-2003 : results of a household survey / by Kawerak, Inc., Maniilaq Association, and the Alaska Department of Fish and Game ; by Susan Georgette ... [et al.]. Hosted by Alaska State Publications Program.

Cities in Alaska
Cities in Northwest Arctic Borough, Alaska
Populated places of the Arctic United States